Ajayb is a sub-district located in al-Radmah District, Ibb Governorate, Yemen. Ajayb had a population of 5622 according to the 2004 census.

References 

Sub-districts in Ar Radmah District